Midhat (also spelled Medhat, Mitat, or Mithat) (Arabic مدحت Romanized: Midḥat) is a masculine given name of Arabic origin. Particularly, in Pakistan Midhat is used as a girl name. The name means 'Praise' or 'Eulogy'.

Persons with the given name Midhat

 Midhat Pasha (1822–1884), Ottoman grand vizier
 Medhat Abdel-Hady (born 1974), Egyptian footballer
 Midhat Şükrü Bleda (1874–1956), Turkish politician
 Midhat Frashëri (1880–1949), Albanian diplomat, writer and politician
 Midhat J. Gazalé (born 1929), Egyptian international telecommunications and space consultant
 Midhat Mursi (1953–2008), Egyptian chemist
 Mithat Sancar (born 1963), Turkish politician 
 Mithat Demirel (born 1978), Basketball player
 Mithat Bayrak (1929–2014) Turkish wrestler
 Mithat Yasar (born 1986) Turkish football player
 Mithat Ertug (1904–unknown) Turkish football player

Persons with the last name Midhat

 Dalal Midhat-Talakić (born 1981), Bosnian female singer

References